The Nuremberg principles are a set of guidelines for determining what constitutes a war crime. The document was created by the International Law Commission of the United Nations to codify the legal principles underlying the Nuremberg Trials of Nazi party members following World War II.

The principles

Principle I

Principle II

Principle III

Principle IV 

This principle could be paraphrased as follows: "It is not an acceptable excuse to say 'I was just following my superior's orders'".

Previous to the time of the Nuremberg Trials, this excuse was known in common parlance as "superior orders". After the prominent, high-profile event of the Nuremberg Trials, that excuse is now referred to by many as the "Nuremberg Defense".  In recent times, a third term, "lawful orders" has become common parlance for some people. All three terms are in use today, and they all have slightly different nuances of meaning, depending on the context in which they are used.

Nuremberg Principle IV is legally supported by the jurisprudence found in certain articles in the Universal Declaration of Human Rights which deal indirectly with conscientious objection. It is also supported by the principles found in paragraph 171 of the Handbook on Procedures and Criteria for Determining Refugee Status which was issued by the Office of the United Nations High Commissioner for Refugees (UNHCR). Those principles deal with the conditions under which conscientious objectors can apply for refugee status in another country if they face persecution in their own country for refusing to participate in an illegal war.

Principle V

Principle VI

Principle VII

The principles' power or lack of power

In the period just prior to the June 26, 1945 signing of the Charter of the United Nations, the governments participating in its drafting were opposed to conferring on the United Nations legislative power to enact binding rules of international law. As a corollary, they also rejected proposals to confer on the General Assembly the power to impose certain general conventions on states by some form of majority vote. There was, however, strong support for conferring on the General Assembly the more limited powers of study and recommendation, which led to the adoption of Article 13 in Chapter IV of the Charter. It obliges the United Nations General Assembly to initiate studies and to make recommendations that encourage the progressive development of international law and its codification. The Nuremberg Principles were developed by UN organs under that limited mandate.

Unlike treaty law, customary international law is not written. To prove that a certain rule is customary one has to show that it is reflected in state practice and that there exists a conviction in the international community that such practice is required as a matter of law. (For example, the Nuremberg Trials were a "practice" of the "international law" of the Nuremberg Principles; and that "practice" was supported by the international community.) In this context, "practice" relates to official state practice and therefore includes formal statements by states. A contrary practice by some states is possible. If this contrary practice is condemned by other states then the rule is confirmed. (See also: Sources of international law)

In 1947, under UN General Assembly Resolution 177 (II), paragraph (a), the International Law Commission was directed to "formulate the principles of international law recognized in the Charter of the Nuremberg Tribunal and in the judgment of the Tribunal." In the course of the consideration of this subject, the question arose as to whether or not the Commission should ascertain to what extent the principles contained in the Charter and judgment constituted principles of international law. The conclusion was that since the Nuremberg Principles had been affirmed by the General Assembly, the task entrusted to the Commission was not to express any appreciation of these principles as principles of international law but merely to formulate them. The text above was adopted by the Commission at its second session. The Report of the Commission also contains commentaries on the principles (see Yearbook of the International Law Commission, 1950, Vol. II, pp. 374–378).

Examples of the principles supported and not supported

The 1998 Rome Statute of the International Criminal Court 

Concerning Nuremberg Principle IV, and its reference to an individual's responsibility, it could be argued that a version of the Superior Orders defense can be found as a defense to international crimes in the Rome Statute of the International Criminal Court. (The Rome Statute was agreed upon in 1998 as the foundational document of the International Criminal Court, established to try those individuals accused of serious international crimes.)  Article 33, titled "Superior Orders and prescription of law,"
states:

2. For the purposes of this article, orders to commit genocide or crimes against humanity are manifestly unlawful.

There are two interpretations of this Article:

This formulation, especially (1)(a), whilst effectively prohibiting the use of the Nuremberg Defense in relation to charges of genocide and crimes against humanity, does however, appear to allow the Nuremberg Defense to be used as a protection against charges of war crimes, provided the relevant criteria are met.
Nevertheless, this interpretation of ICC Article 33 is open to debate: For example, Article 33 (1)(c) protects the defendant only if "the order was not manifestly unlawful." The "order" could be considered "unlawful" if we consider Nuremberg Principle IV to be the applicable "law"  in this case.  If so, then the defendant is not protected.  Discussion as to whether or not Nuremberg Principle IV is the applicable law in this case is found in a discussion of the Nuremberg Principles' power or lack of power.

Canada

Nuremberg Principle IV, and its reference to an individual's responsibility, was also at issue in Canada in the case of Hinzman v. Canada. Jeremy Hinzman was a U.S. Army deserter who claimed refugee status in Canada as a conscientious objector, one of many Iraq War resisters. Hinzman's lawyer, Jeffry House, had previously raised the issue of the legality of the Iraq War as having a bearing on their case. The Federal Court ruling was released on March 31, 2006, and denied the refugee status claim. In the decision, Justice Anne L. Mactavish addressed the issue of personal responsibility:

An individual must be involved at the policy-making level to be culpable for a crime against peace ... the ordinary foot soldier is not expected to make his or her own personal assessment as to the legality of a conflict. Similarly, such an individual cannot be held criminally responsible for fighting in support of an illegal war, assuming that his or her personal war-time conduct is otherwise proper.Hinzman v. Canada  Federal Court decision. Paras (157) and (158). Accessed 2008-06-18

On Nov 15, 2007, a quorum  of the Supreme Court of Canada consisting of Justices Michel Bastarache, Rosalie Abella, and Louise Charron refused an application to have the Court hear the case on appeal, without giving reasons.

See also 

Command responsibility
Geneva Conventions
International Criminal Court
International legal theory
Laws of war
London Charter of the International Military Tribunal
Nuremberg Code
Nuremberg Trials
Rule of Law in Armed Conflicts Project
Rule of law
Rule According to Higher Law
Sources of international law

Footnotes

References

Principles of International Law Recognized in the Charter of the Nürnberg Tribunal and in the Judgment of the Tribunal, 1950.  on the website of the International Committee of the Red Cross (ICRC)
Principles of International Law Recognized in the Charter of the Nürnberg Tribunal and in the Judgment of the Tribunal, 1950.  on the website of the United Nations (UN)

Further reading

 Introductory note by Antonio Cassese  for General Assembly resolution 95(I) of 11 December 1946 (Affirmation of the Principles of International Law recognized by the Charter of the Nürnberg Tribunal) on the website of the UN Audiovisual Library of International Law 
Nuremberg Trial Proceedings Vol. 1 Charter of the International Military Tribunal  contained in the Avalon Project archive at Yale Law School
 Judgment : The Law Relating to War Crimes and Crimes Against Humanity  contained in the Avalon Project archive at Yale Law School

External links
 István Deák, Retribution against Heads of State and Prime Ministers

Holocaust trials
International criminal law
Nuremberg trials
History of Nuremberg
Legal doctrines and principles
Crime of aggression
Crimes against humanity
International Law Commission